Kathryn is a feminine given name and comes from the Greek meaning for 'pure'. It is a variant of Katherine.  It may refer to:

In television and film:
 Kathryn Beaumont (born 1938), English voice actress and school teacher best known for her Disney animation film works
 Kathryn Bernardo (born 1996), Filipina actress and recording artist
 Kathryn Bigelow (born 1951), American film director, first woman to win the Academy Award, BAFTA, and DGA award for Best Director
 Kathryn Busby, American television and film executive
 Kathryn Cressida also known as "Kat" Cressida (born 1968), American voice actress
 Kathryn Crosby (born 1933), American actress and singer who performed her most memorable roles under her birth-name Kathryn Grant
 Kathryn Drysdale (born 1981), English actress
 Kathryn Eames (1908 – 2004), American screen, stage, and television actress
 Kathryn Erbe (born 1966), American actress best known for her lead role as Detective Eames on Law & Order: Criminal Intent
 Kathryn Grayson (1922 – 2010), American lead actress and operatic soprano singer with MGM and Warner Brothers
 Kathryn Hahn (born 1974), American actress best known for her role as Lily Lebowski on Crossing Jordan
 Kathryn Hess (born 1967), American mathematician
 Kathryn Joosten (1939 – 2012), American actress known for roles on The West Wing and Desperate Housewives
 Kathryn Kinley (born 1965), American television personality, journalist and musical theater actress
 Kathryn McGuire (1903 – 1978), American silent-film actress and dancer
 Kathryn Morris (born 1969), American actress best known for her lead role as Detective Lilly Rush on Cold Case
 Kathryn Leigh Scott (born 1943), American television and film actress known for her roles in the soap opera Dark Shadows

In astronomy:
 Kathryn P. Hire (born 1959), American astronaut with over 381 hours in space
 Kathryn Dwyer Sullivan (born 1951), in 1984 became the first American woman to walk in space, and with 532 hours in space
 Kathryn C. Thornton (born 1952), American astronaut with over 975 hours in space

In music:
 Kathryn Calder, Canadian singer-songwriter and member of The New Pornographers
 Kathryn Dawn Lang (k.d. lang) (born 1961), Canadian musician, singer, and songwriter
 Kathryn Roberts, English folk singer
 Kathryn Scott (b. 1974), a singer-songwriter of Contemporary Christian music Northern Ireland
 Kathryn Tickell, (born 1967), English player of the Northumbrian smallpipes and fiddle

In literature:
 Kathryn Deans, Australian children's fantasy author
 Kathryn H. Kidd, Orson Scott Card's co-author in writing a novel named Lovelock
 Kathryn Hulme (1900 – 1981), American author best known for The Nun's Story
 Kathryn Schulz, American freelance writer and journalist
 Kathryn Stockett, American novelist
 Kathryn Tucker Windham (1918 – 2011), American storyteller, author, photographer and journalist

In politics:
 Kathryn I. Bowers (born 1943), American politician and Democratic former member of the Tennessee Senate representing the 33rd district
 Kathryn Garcia (born 1970), Commissioner of the New York City Sanitation Department
 Kathryn E. Granahan née O'Hay (1894 – 1979), American Democratic U.S. Representative from Pennsylvania, 32nd Treasurer of the United States
 Kathryn Hay (born 1975), Tasmanian Labor politician and member of the Tasmanian House of Assembly in the electorate of Bass
 Kathryn O'Loughlin McCarthy née O'Loughlin (1894 – 1952), American Democratic politician and first female U.S. Representative from Kansas

In sports:
 Kathryn Ainsworth, Australian netballer
 Kathryn Binns later became Kathryn Davis (born 1958), English long-distance runner of marathons and half marathon events
 Kathryn Colin "Kathy" Colin (born 1974), American Olympic contender and Pan American Games medalist in canoeing
 Kathryn Teasdale (1964–2016), Canadian auto racing driver

In other fields:
 Kathryn Janeway, fictional Federation starship captain of the USS Voyager in Star Trek: Voyager and admiral in Star Trek: Nemesis
 Kathryn Howard
 Kathryn Mann, mathematician
 Kathryn S. McKinley, American computer scientist
 Kathryn Morgan (born 1988), American ballet dancer
 Kathryn Parsons (born 1982), British tech entrepreneur
 Kathryn Shaw, Canadian theatre actor and director

Events
 Shooting of Kathryn Steinle, a 2015 incident in San Francisco carried out by illegal immigrant Jose Inez Garcia Zarate

See also
 Katherine
 Catherine
 Lake Kathryn (disambiguation)

References

English feminine given names
English given names
Given names of Greek language origin